Viva Death are an America rock band formed from members of the bands Face to Face, Foo Fighters and The Vandals. They have released three albums to date and also have numerous unreleased tracks on their website. Viva Death are known for using Baritone guitars rather than normal guitars to achieve their unique sound.

Members
 Scott Shiflett – Baritone guitar, vocals
 Trever Keith – Baritone guitar, vocals
 Chris Shiflett – Baritone guitar
 Josh Freese – Drums
 Chad Blinman – Noises and Effects

Discography
 Viva Death (September 2002)
 One Percent Panic (October 31, 2006)
 Curse the Darkness (May 11, 2010)
 Illuminate (October 2018)

External links
Official site
A myspace site featuring clips and b-sides from the most recent album
The consumer forums
Vagrant Records shop

Alternative rock groups from California
Musical groups established in 2002
2002 establishments in California